Orthotylus prasinus  is a Palearctic species of  true bug

References
 

Orthotylus
Hemiptera of Europe
Insects described in 1826